The 1972 Iowa State Senate elections took place as part of the biennial 1972 United States elections. Iowa voters elected state senators in all of the state senate's 50 districts—the 25 even-numbered seats were up for regularly-scheduled four-year terms and, due to the oddities of redistricting following the 1970 Census, the 25 odd-numbered seats were up for shortened two-year terms. State senators typically serve four-year terms in the Iowa State Senate, with half of the seats traditionally up for election each cycle. The decennial census and redistricting process causes one cycle each decade to be disrupted.

The Iowa General Assembly provides statewide maps of each district. To compare the effect of the 1971 redistricting process on the location of each district, contrast the previous map with the map used for 1972 elections.

The primary election on June 6, 1972 determined which candidates appeared on the November 7, 1972 general election ballot. The Iowa Secretary of State only provides the names of candidates who ran in the 1972 primaries and does not report vote tallies. The primary candidates' names can be obtained here. General election results can be obtained here.

Following the previous election, Republicans had control of the Iowa state Senate with 38 seats to Democrats' 12 seats. In March 1971, a special election in district 11 resulted in G. William "Bill" Gross flipping a seat in favor of the Democrats. Therefore, on election day in November 1972, Republicans controlled 37 seats and Democrats had 13.

To claim control of the chamber from Republicans, the Democrats needed to net 13 Senate seats.

Republicans maintained control of the Iowa State Senate following the 1972 general election with the balance of power shifting to Republicans holding 28 seats and Democrats having 22 seats (a net gain of 9 seats for the Democrats).

Summary of Results
NOTE: The 25 even-numbered districts were up for four-year terms and the 25 odd-numbered districts were up for two-year terms due to the 1971 redistricting process.
Also note, an asterisk (*) after a Senator's name indicates they were an incumbent re-elected, but to a new district number due to redistricting. 

Source:

Detailed Results
Reminder: All even-numbered Iowa Senate seats were up for four-year terms and all odd-numbered seats were up for two-year terms in 1972 due to the oddities caused by redistricting.

Note: The Iowa Secretary of State only lists the names of 1972 primary candidates, instead of actual election results. Only general election vote tallies are provided.

District 1

District 2

District 3

District 4

District 5

District 6

District 7

District 8

District 9

District 10

District 11

District 12

District 13

District 14

District 15

District 16

District 17

District 18

District 19

District 20

District 21

District 22

District 23

District 24

District 25

District 26

District 27

District 28

District 29

District 30

District 31

District 32

District 33

District 34

District 35

District 36

District 37

District 38

District 39

District 40

District 41

District 42

District 43

District 44

District 45

District 46

District 47

James Turner died and this necessitated a special election.

District 48

District 49

District 50

See also
 United States elections, 1972
 United States House of Representatives elections in Iowa, 1972
 Elections in Iowa

References

1972 Iowa elections
Iowa Senate elections
Iowa State Senate